William Montgomery Churchwell (February 20, 1826August 18, 1862) was an American politician and a member of the United States House of Representatives. He also served as Confederate States Army officer during the American Civil War.

Biography
Churchwell was born near Knoxville, Tennessee in Knox County on February 20, 1826. He attended private schools and Emory and Henry College in Emory, Virginia from 1840 to 1843. He studied law, was admitted to the bar, and commenced practice in Knoxville. He married Martha Eleanor Deery.

Career
Churchwell served as one of the judges for Knox County. He was elected as a Democrat to the Thirty-second Congress by Tennessee's 3rd congressional district, and then by Tennessee's 2nd congressional district to the Thirty-third Congress after Tennessee had lost a district through reapportionment. He served from March 4, 1851 to March 3, 1853 for the 3rd district, and from March 4, 1853 to March 3, 1855 for the 2nd district.  As of 2021, he is the most recent Democrat to represent the Tennessee 2nd District.  During the Thirty-third Congress, he was the chairman of the United States House Committee on Pensions and Revolutionary War Claims.

Churchwell was later a provost marshal for the district of east Tennessee. During the administration of President Buchanan, he was sent on a secret mission to Mexico. He served in the Confederate states Army as colonel of the 34th Tennessee Infantry Regiment (4th Provisional Tennessee Infantry) during the American Civil War.

Death
Churchwell died in Knoxville, Tennessee on August 18, 1862 (age 36 years, 179 days). He is interred at Old Gray Cemetery.

References

1826 births
1862 deaths
19th-century American politicians
19th-century American diplomats
Emory and Henry College alumni
Ambassadors of the United States to Mexico
Confederate States Army officers
Democratic Party members of the United States House of Representatives from Tennessee
Politicians from Knoxville, Tennessee